Tom Gavan (also Romanized as Tom Gāvān; also known as Dom Gāvān and S̄om Gāvān) is a village in Dowlatabad Rural District, in the Central District of Jiroft County, Kerman Province, Iran. At the 2006 census, its population was 355, in 80 families.

References 

Populated places in Jiroft County